Nikolay Anatolyevich Kovalev (born 28 October 1986) is a Russian sabre fencer. He won a bronze medal in the 2012 Summer Olympics in London and a gold medal in the 2014 World Championships in Kazan. He is three-times World team champion (2010, 2011 and 2013) and twice European team champion (2007 and 2012). He is now a coach in California in the United States.

Career

Kovalev became European Junior champion in 2002 at Conegliano. He won the silver medal in the 2005 Junior World Championships at Linz, then a bronze medal in the 2006 Junior World Championships at Taebaek City.

Amongst seniors, he climbed his first World Cup podium in 2006 with a second place in the Gerevich-Kovács-Kárpáti Cup in Budapest. He won the team gold medal in the 2006 European Championships. He went on to earn the team bronze medal at the 2006 World Fencing Championships in Turin  with Aleksey Frosin, Stanislav Pozdnyakov and Aleksey Yakimenko, after Russia defeated Hungary in the match for the third place.

Kovalev took part in the 2008 Summer Olympics in Beijing, but was defeated  in the table of 32 by Jaime Martí of Spain. In the team event, Russia were stopped in the semi-finals by the United States, then defeated by Italy in the match for the third place, and Kovalev returned without a medal.

In the 2010 World Championships, Russia met Italy in the final. Kovalev came back from 4–15 in the fourth relay to give Russia the lead, scoring 12 hits against Luigi Tarantino. Russia eventually defeated Italy 45 to 41, allowing mates Aleksey Yakimenko, Artem Zanin, Veniamin Reshetnikov and Kovalev to take the gold. At the 2011 World Championships they retained the title in men's sabre team defeating Belarus in the final.

In the 2012 Summer Olympics in London, Kovalev advanced to the semi-finals, where he was defeated by Áron Szilágyi of Hungary. He then prevailed over Romania's Rareș Dumitrescu to come away with the bronze medal. He attributed his success to national coach Christian Bauer, who according to him introduced Russia to the world of modern fencing. He received the title of "Honored Master of Sports" for his Olympic performance, but did not particularly enjoy the attention it brought to him, describing the constant interviews and photo shoots as "a horror".

In the 2013 World Championships in Budapest, Kovalev made his way to the semi-finals, where he defeated Áron Szilágyi. He then met teammate Veniamin Reshetnikov, who prevailed 15–13, dooming Kovalev to a silver medal. In the team event, Russia prevailed over reigning Olympic champion South Korea, then defeated Romania to take the gold medal. During the event Kovalev was also elected a member of the International Fencing Federation's athlete commission.

As of 2021, he was a coach at the Laguna Fencing Center in California in the United States.

References

External links
 
  (archive)
  (archive)
 
 
 

1986 births
Living people
Russian male sabre fencers
Olympic fencers of Russia
Olympic bronze medalists for Russia
Olympic medalists in fencing
Fencers at the 2008 Summer Olympics
Fencers at the 2012 Summer Olympics
Fencers at the 2016 Summer Olympics
Medalists at the 2012 Summer Olympics
Universiade medalists in fencing
Universiade gold medalists for Russia
World Fencing Championships medalists
Medalists at the 2013 Summer Universiade
21st-century Russian people